Rajai Dasht (also Romanized as Rajā'ī Dasht) is a village in Rudbar-e Mohammad-e Zamani Rural District, Alamut-e Gharbi District, Qazvin County, Qazvin Province, Iran. At the 2006 census, its population was 648, in 177 families.

References 

Populated places in Qazvin County